The Northwestern League was a sports league that operated in the Central United States during the early years of professional baseball for five seasons: 1879, 1883–1884, and 1886–1887. After the 1887 season, the league was replaced by the Western Association. A second Northwestern League, located in the Pacific Northwest, formed in 1905.

The Northwestern League of 1883–1884 is considered the first baseball "minor league", as it was party to the National Agreement of 1883, along with the National League and American Association, whereby the leagues agreed to honor each other's suspensions, expulsions, and player reserve clauses, and established territorial rights.

Results by season
The league operated for a total of five seasons, during a span of nine years.

1879

Four teams participated in the 1879 season, which ran from May 1 to July 7.

Source:

1883

The 1883 season featured eight teams and ran from May 1 to September 29.

Source:

1884
The 1884 season began on May 1 with 12 teams. The Bay City team disbanded in late July and was replaced by Evansville. In early August, multiple other teams disbanded. Play continued through August 13, at which time Milwaukee had the best record of teams still active. Milwaukee was later offered the league championship for the abbreviated season, but declined it.

Source:

The league reorganized on August 14, and started a second season with a limited schedule of 24 games planned for each of four teams. This short season would also end early due to financial difficulties, with the final game played on September 7.

Source:

The St. Paul and Milwaukee teams were late-season additions to the major league Union Association.

1886–1887
In 1886, the league was recreated when the Duluth Jayhawks; Eau Claire Lumbermen; St. Paul Freezers, Minneapolis Millers, Milwaukee Brewers, and  the Oshkosh, Wisconsin team composed the league. Duluth won the championship.

In 1887, the Northwestern League featured the Des Moines Hawkeyes, Duluth Freezers, Eau Claire, LaCrosse Freezers, Milwaukee Cream Citys, Minneapolis Millers, Oshkosh and the St. Paul Saints. Oshkosh won the championship.

Cities Represented 1891
Bay City, MI: Bay City 
Dayton, OH: Dayton 
Detroit, MI: Detroit Wolverines 
Evansville, IN: Evansville Hoosiers 
Fort Wayne, IN: Ft. Wayne 
Grand Rapids, MI: Grand Rapids Shamrocks 
Peoria, IL: Peoria Distillers 
Terre Haute, IN: Terre Haute Hottentots

Teams and Statistics 1891 
1891 Northwestern League - schedule President: W.H. Ketcham
Peoria and Dayton disbanded July 16; Bay City disbanded June 7; Detroit disbanded June 6 Peoria won the first and second split-season. Evansville won the third split-season

References

Further reading

External links
Northwestern League - Baseball Reference

Defunct minor baseball leagues in the United States
Baseball leagues in Iowa
Baseball leagues in Illinois
Baseball leagues in Wisconsin
Baseball leagues in Indiana
Baseball leagues in Minnesota
Baseball leagues in Michigan
Baseball leagues in Ohio
Baseball leagues in Nebraska